Caja Segovia Fútbol Sala, was a futsal club based in Segovia, city of the Province of Segovia in the autonomous community of Castile and León.

The club was founded in 1985 and held its home matches in Pedro Delgado with capacity of 2,800 seaters.

History
In July 2013, after 24 seasons in top league of Spanish futsal, and after failing to pay the enrolment fee to play in Primera División 2013–14, were relegated to Segunda División changing its official name to CD La Escuela.

In August 2013, the club was disbanded due to large debts and a new club was created taking the Caja Segovia spot in Segunda División.

Season to season

24 seasons in Primera División

Trophies
División de Honor: 1
Winners: 1998-99
Futsal European Clubs Championship: 1
Winners: 1999-00
Intercontinental Futsal Cup: 1
Winners: 2000
Copa de España: 3
Winners: 1997–98, 1998–99 and 1999-00
Supercopa de España: 3
Winners:  1998, 1999 and 2000

Notable former players
 Roberto Tobe
 Lin
 Sergio Lozano
 Álvaro Aparicio

References

External links
Former official website

 
Futsal clubs in Castile and León
Futsal clubs established in 1985
Sports clubs disestablished in 2013
1985 establishments in Spain
Sport in Segovia